Euphorbia humistrata, known by the common names of spreading sandmat or spreading broomspurge, is a member of the spurge family, Euphorbiaceae. It is an annual herb, native to the southern and midwestern United States.

References

humistrata
Flora of Florida
Flora of the Southeastern United States
Flora of Alabama
Flora of Georgia (U.S. state)
Flora of Mississippi
Flora of Louisiana
Flora of Texas
Flora of Oklahoma
Flora of Kansas
Flora of Arkansas
Flora of Missouri
Flora of Illinois
Flora of Kentucky
Flora of Tennessee
Flora of Indiana
Flora of Ohio
Flora of West Virginia
Flora of Virginia